This is a discography of George Thorogood and The Destroyers, which consists of George Thorogood and his band the Delaware Destroyers.

Albums

Studio albums

Live albums

Compilation albums

 double disc of Ride 'Til I Die (w/ 2 bonus tracks) and 30th Anniversary Tour

Singles

Notes

References

External links
 George Thorogood at AllMusic
 

Discographies of American artists
Rock music group discographies